is a railway station on the Hokuriku Main Line in the city of Hakusan, Ishikawa, Japan, operated by West Japan Railway Company (JR West).

Lines

Station layout
The station consists of two opposed unnumbered side platforms connected by a footbridge. The station is attended.

Platforms

History
Kaga-Kasama Station opened on 1 August 1923. With the privatization of Japanese National Railways (JNR) on 1 April 1987, the station came under the control of JR West.

Passenger statistics
In fiscal 2015, the station was used by an average of 1,552 passengers daily (boarding passengers only).

Surrounding area
Kinjo University

See also
 List of railway stations in Japan

References

External links

  

Stations of West Japan Railway Company
Railway stations in Ishikawa Prefecture
Railway stations in Japan opened in 1923
Hokuriku Main Line
Hakusan, Ishikawa